Jewel McGowan (1921-1962) is best known as a dancer of Lindy Hop, a form of swing dance, in the 1940s and 1950s. She also danced in other, non-swing films, and with modern jazz dance pioneer Jack Cole. She is known among dance aficionados as the frequent partner of dancer Dean Collins. McGowan was considered by her fellow Los Angeles dancers to be the best female swing dancer who ever lived. In addition to their social dancing, Collins and McGowan appeared together as dancers in films of the era. They were partners for 11 years. McGowan is especially known for her hip swivels.

Selected filmography

Buck Privates (1941), partner Dean Collins
Playmates (1941), partner Dean Collins
Dance Hall (1941), partner Dean Collins
Ride 'Em Cowboy (1942), partner Dean Collins
Springtime in the Rockies (1942), partner Dean Collins
The Talk of the Town (1942), partner Dean Collins
Always a Bridesmaid (1943), partner Dean Collins
Young Ideas (1943), jitterbug dancer
The Powers Girl (1943), partner Dean Collins (famous for dancing in the rain with an umbrella)
Kid Dynamite (1943), partner Dean Collins
Living It Up (1954), partner Dean Collins

Dean and Jewel also appeared in a few short films such as "Chool Song," and Jewel appeared solo in the short "Hilo Hattie" doing the hula in a grass skirt.

Television documentaries
In the Kingdom of Swing (1993), partner Dean Collins (on Benny Goodman)

Honors
California Swing Dance Hall of Fame (1990), Stellar Star Award

See also
 List of dancers

References

External links

American female dancers
Lindy Hop
1962 deaths
1921 births
American swing dancers
Place of birth missing
20th-century American dancers
20th-century American women